Newburgh Lock and Dam is the 16th lock and dam on the Ohio River, located  down stream of Pittsburgh.There are two locks.

History
Newburgh Lock and Dam replaced lock and dams 46 and 47 on the Ohio river.

See also
 List of locks and dams of the Ohio River
 List of locks and dams of the Upper Mississippi River

References

External links
U.S. Army Corps of Engineers, Pittsburgh District
U.S. Army Corps of Engineers, Huntington District
U.S. Army Corps of Engineers, Louisville District

Dams on the Ohio River
Dams in Kentucky
Dams in Indiana
Dams completed in 1975
Locks of Kentucky
Locks of Indiana
1975 establishments in Indiana
1975 establishments in Kentucky